The 1925 Calgary municipal election was held on December 16, 1925 to elect a Mayor and seven Aldermen to sit on Calgary City Council. Along with positions on Calgary City Council, five trustees for the public school board. Mayor George Harry Webster was acclaimed following the close of nominations. The three candidates for the separate school board P. V. Burgard, John Burns and A. J. MacMillan were also acclaimed.

Calgary City Council governed under "Initiative, Referendum and Recall" which is composed of a Mayor, Commissioner and twelve Aldermen all elected to staggered two year terms. Six Aldermen: Frederick Johnston, Thomas H. Crawford, Frederick Ernest Osborne, Fred J. White, Neil I. McDermid, and John Walker Russell elected in 1924 continued in their positions.

A number of plebiscites were held, all requiring a two-thirds majority to pass.

Background

The election was held under the Single Transferable Voting/Proportional Representation (STV/PR) with the term for candidates being two years.

Results

Council
Quota for election was 1,277.

Public School Board
Quota for election was 1,608.

Plebiscites

Bridge Bylaw
Bridge bylaw for an expenditure of $22,000 to replace Nose Creek Bridge. Required a two-thirds majority to pass.  - Defeated

School Clinic
School Clinic Vote. Required a simple majority to pass - Carried

See also
List of Calgary municipal elections

References

1920s in Calgary
Municipal elections in Calgary
1925 elections in Canada